Alexei Andreevich Vasilevsky (Василевский, Алексей Андреевич ; January 21, 1993) is a Russian ice hockey defenceman. He is currently playing with Avtomobilist Yekaterinburg of the Kontinental Hockey League (KHL).

Vasilevsky made his KHL debut playing with Salavat Yulaev Ufa during the 2012–13 KHL season.

References

External links

1993 births
Living people
Avtomobilist Yekaterinburg players
Russian ice hockey defencemen
Salavat Yulaev Ufa players
Sportspeople from Ufa
Toros Neftekamsk players